Jonathan Mayhew Wainwright (December 10, 1864 – June 3, 1945) was an American lawyer and politician from New York. He was the United States Assistant Secretary of War from 1921 to 1923.

Early life
Wainwright was born Manhattan, New York City to John Howard Wainwright and Margaret Livingston (née Stuyvesant) Wainwright. His older brother was Stuyvesant Wainwright (father of Carroll Livingston Wainwright I).

His maternal grandfather was Nicholas Stuyvesant, a son of Nicholas William Stuyvesant, grandson of the merchant Peter Stuyvesant, all direct descendants of Peter Stuyvesant, the last Dutch Director-General of New Amsterdam. U.S. Army General Jonathan M. Wainwright was his cousin.

Wainwright graduated from Columbia College; from Columbia School of Political Science in 1884, and from Columbia Law School in 1886. While at Columbia, he was a member of St. Anthony Hall.

Career
In 1886, he was admitted to the bar the same year and practiced in New York City and in Westchester County. He served in the Twelfth Infantry of the New York National Guard (1889–1903), and in the Spanish–American War as captain of the Twelfth Regiment of New York Volunteers.

Wainwright was a member of the New York State Assembly in 1902, 1903, 1904, 1905, 1906 (all five Westchester Co., 2nd D.), 1907 and 1908 (both Westchester Co., 4th D.).

He was a member of the New York State Senate (24th D.) from 1909 to 1912, sitting in the 132nd, 133rd, 134th and 135th New York State Legislatures.

He was appointed as a member of the first New York State Workmen's Compensation Commission in 1914 and served until 1915. He served as lieutenant colonel, inspector general's department, New York National Guard, on the Mexican border in 1916. During the First World War, Wainwright served as a lieutenant colonel in the Twenty-seventh Division from 1917 to 1919.

He was appointed by President Warren G. Harding to serve as Assistant Secretary of War from March 14, 1921, to March 4, 1923, when he resigned.

Wainwright was elected as a Republican to the 68th, 69th, 70th and 71st United States Congresses, holding office from March 4, 1923, to March 3, 1931. He resumed the practice of law and served as a member of the Westchester County Park Commission from 1930 to 1937.

Personal life
He married Laura Wallace Buchanan (1865–1946) on November 23, 1892 in New York. Together, they were the parents of:

 Fonrose Wainwright (1893–1983), who married Phillip King Condict (1880–1949).

He died on June 3, 1945, in Rye, New York. He was buried at the Greenwood Union Cemetery there.

References
Notes

Sources

External links

 

1864 births
1945 deaths
J Mayhew
Columbia Law School alumni
United States Army officers
Republican Party members of the New York State Assembly
Republican Party New York (state) state senators
Republican Party members of the United States House of Representatives from New York (state)
United States Assistant Secretaries of War
Columbia College (New York) alumni